Doña Bárbara is a novel by Venezuelan author Rómulo Gallegos.

Doña Bárbara may also refer to:

Doña Bárbara (1943 film), a 1943 Mexican romantic drama film
Doña Bárbara (1998 film), a 1998 Argentine-Spanish romantic drama film
Doña Bárbara (1967 opera), a 1967 American opera
Doña Bárbara (1967 TV series), a Venezuelan telenovela
Doña Bárbara (1975 TV series), a Venezuelan telenovela
Doña Bárbara (2008 TV series), a Spanish-language telenovela